The Cave of Niaux (French: Grotte de Niaux) is located in the Niaux commune, Ariège département in south-western France as part of a wider geological system that includes the Sabart Cave and Lombrives Cave in the hill of Cap de la Lesse de Bialac. An archaeological site with a documented history of Paleo-human presence, Niaux contains numerous distinct areas and galleries of carefully drawn and vivid wall paintings, executed in a black-outlined style typical of the classic Magdalenian period, between 17,000 and 11,000 years ago.

Overview 

Félix Garrigou, prehistorian and hydrologist, known for his investigations of caves of southern France visited the site in 1869. He is the first person attributed to a documented suspicion - notes in his diary - about the true identity of the site.

Research    
Only after a Commander Molard and his sons had discovered the gallery of Salon Noir and published a plan of the cave did Niaux attract specialists' attention in 1869. It was investigated by Henri Breuil and Emile Cartailhac a year later and received full-scale recognition. In 1925 J. Mandeman found another gallery with black paintings and called it Cartailhac Gallery. In 1971, a major scientific examination was undertaken by Jean Clottes and Robert Simonnet and in 1980 and 1981 a team of scientists made an inventory of all the pictures in the cave.

Site 

Niaux Cave, situated in a steep-sided valley in the commune of Vicdessos in the Tarascon basin is one of the few cave systems left where exceptional prehistoric paintings can still be viewed by the public. The previously unrecorded separate Reseau Clastres network has been found only as recently as 1970. It holds a series of prehistoric 'footprints' and a rare charcoal sketch of a weasel.

Black Hall panel 

"The base of the stone is not colored and the range is restricted for the figures: black and some red for a few of the signs.
The predominating animal is the bison, represented in the upper part of the panel.  The bison standing out in the left central part is usually catalogued as a female, due to the shapes presented, such as the scarcely prominent hump. By contrast and in opposition to this is the male, found on the right-hand side and showing a more prominent hump.

The lower part of the wall represents several horses which, with painted hair, represent a member of the equine family with a great amount of hair, the Przewalski. The bestiary is finished off with two goats, one represented in a very natural manner and the other in a totally schematic manner. The panel is dated as being 13,000 years old. The walk to the paintings leads through both big caves and narrow passages. The cave floor has been left in its natural state: wet, very uneven and slippery in places so sturdy walking shoes are essential."

A facsimile of Niaux’s Salon Noir (in its pristine form), as well as of other figures in the cave and the Réseau Clastres, is displayed in the nearby Park of Prehistoric Art, near Tarascon-sur-Ariège.

See also
 Limeuil (prehistoric site)

References

Bibliography 
 ^ Paul G. Bahn; Jean Vertut (1997). Journey Through the Ice Age. University of California Press. pp. 16–. .

External links
 Visiting the Niaux cave: Practical Information
 ^ Jun Tsuji (2004). The Soul of DNA. Llumina Press. pp. 19–. .
 ^ Moshe Barasch (1 March 1998). Modern Theories of Art 2: From Impressionism to Kandinsky. NYU Press. pp. 211–. .

Prehistoric sites in France
Landforms of Ariège (department)
History of Ariège (department)
Caves of Occitania (administrative region)
World Heritage Sites in France
Caves containing pictograms in France
Show caves in France
Tourist attractions in Ariège (department)